Peter Žnidarčič (born 7 March 1992) is a Slovenian male canoeist who won eight medals at the World champion at Wildwater Canoeing World Championships.

References

External links
 

1992 births
Living people
Slovenian male canoeists
Place of birth missing (living people)